Mercey may refer to:

 French communes
 Mercey, Eure, in the Eure department
 Mercey-le-Grand, in the Doubs department
 Mercey-sur-Saône, in the Haute-Saône department

 Other
 Mercey Brothers, a Canadian country music group
 Tom Mercey, an English rugby union footballer

See also
Mercy
Mersey (disambiguation)